Tariq Amir Owens (born June 30, 1995) is an American professional basketball player for Pallacanestro Varese of the Lega Basket Serie A (LBA). He played college basketball for the Texas Tech Red Raiders and St. John's having transferred after his freshman year at Tennessee.

Early life and high school career
Owens is the son of Cassandra Wallace and Renard Owens and has two older sisters. Wallace died of pancreatic cancer when he was 14 years old. Owens attended St. Vincent Pallotti High School, where he was coached by Shae Johnson. He was teammates with future Clemson player Marcquise Reed. Owens spent a postgraduate year at Mount Zion Prep. He originally signed with Ohio but was released after a coaching change.

College career
Owens began his collegiate career at Tennessee, playing for one season before transferring to St. John's. He averaged 5.2 points and 5.2 rebounds per game as a sophomore. As a junior at St. John's, Owens averaged 8.4 points, 5.9 rebounds and a Big East Conference-best 2.8 blocks per game. Following the season, Owens opted to transfer as a graduate student, selecting Texas Tech over an offer from Maryland.

Owens scored 18 points in a 78-63 win over USC on November 20, 2018. As a senior at Texas Tech, Owens averaged 8.7 points, 5.8 rebounds and 2.4 blocks per game. He helped lead the Red Raiders to the 2019 NCAA Men's Basketball Championship game. Owens was named to the Big 12 Conference All-Defensive Team and honorable mention All-Big 12.

Professional career

Northern Arizona Suns (2019–2020)
After going undrafted in the 2019 NBA draft, Owens did not play in the NBA Summer League but suited up for the Phoenix Suns. On July 18, 2019, Owens signed an Exhibit 10 contract with the Suns. but was waived on October 15. He was named to the roster of the Suns’ NBA G League affiliate, the Northern Arizona Suns. Owens had a double-double with 14 points and 15 rebounds in a 117-113 loss to the Texas Legends on November 12. On January 5, 2020, Owens led the team in scoring with 18 points to go with nine rebounds, one assist, one steal and one block across in a 101-93 victory over the Rio Grande Valley Vipers, helping snap a 13-game losing streak for Northern Arizona.

Phoenix Suns (2020)
On January 15, 2020, the Phoenix Suns announced that they had signed Owens to a two-way contract. In his NBA debut on February 2, Owens scored two points and grabbed two rebounds in a 129-108 loss to the Milwaukee Bucks.

Long Island Nets (2021–2022)
On January 27, 2021, Owens was included in the roster of the Long Island Nets, who mentioned that the returning right to Owens had been acquired from the Northern Arizona Suns along with returning right to Matt Farrell in exchange to returning rights to Joe Cremo and Drew Gordon earlier during off-season trades.

Pallacanestro Varese (2022–present)
On July 19, 2022, he has signed with Pallacanestro Varese of the Lega Basket Serie A (LBA).

Career statistics

NBA

|-
| style="text-align:left;"| 
| style="text-align:left;"| Phoenix
| 3 || 0 || 5.0 || .200 || .000 || 1.000 || 1.0 || .0 || .3 || .0 || 1.3
|- class="sortbottom"
| style="text-align:center;" colspan="2"| Career
| 3 || 0 || 5.0 || .200 || .000 || 1.000 || 1.0 || .0 || .3 || .0 || 1.3

References

External links
St. John's Red Storm bio

1995 births
Living people
American men's basketball players
Basketball players from New York (state)
Long Island Nets players
Northern Arizona Suns players
Pallacanestro Varese players
Phoenix Suns players
Power forwards (basketball)
Sportspeople from Utica, New York
St. John's Red Storm men's basketball players
Tennessee Volunteers basketball players
Texas Tech Red Raiders basketball players
Undrafted National Basketball Association players